Candice Huffine (born October 15, 1984) is an American plus-size model represented by IMG Models. A former teenage beauty queen, she signed her first modeling commercial contract in 2000 and has since crossed over from the commercial world into high fashion.

Early life
Huffine was born in Washington, D.C., and raised in suburban Maryland.

Career 

As a plus-size model Huffine has become known for reducing barriers in the fashion industry. Her A-list work includes being featured in publications such as CR Fashion Book, Italian Vogue (cover), Vogue, W, V Magazine, i-D and Glamour. She has worked with top industry names such as Mert and Marcus and Steven Meisel as well as Carine Roitfeld.

In 2015 she became the first plus-size woman to be featured in the Pirelli Calendar and it 2016 she gained international attention for Lane Bryant's #ImNoAngel campaign. She has appeared in multiple New York Fashion Week's including 2017 Fall/Winter walking the runway for noted designers such as Prabal Gurung, Sophie Theallet and Christian Siriano.

Project Start 
In 2016 Huffine founded Project Start, a collaborative initiative with Women's Running Magazine to encourage and inspire women to begin their running journey.

Personal life 
She married Matt Powers in October 2011 in Brooklyn, New York. The couple live in Williamsburg, Brooklyn with their dog Jerry Brows.

References

Further reading
 
 
 
 
 
 

1984 births
Living people
American female models
Female models from Washington, D.C.
IMG Models models
People from Williamsburg, Brooklyn
Plus-size models
21st-century American women